Martin Cummins (born November 28, 1969) is a Canadian actor known for his role as Ames White in Dark Angel and as Nick Boyle in Poltergeist: The Legacy.

Life and career
Cummins went to Seaquam Secondary School in the town of North Delta, British Columbia, Canada. He attended the Vancouver Actors Studio. One of his first significant roles was as host of the teen variety series Pilot One on CBC Television.

Cummins guest-starred in a number of American and Canadian television shows before landing the part of Nick Boyle in the MGM series Poltergeist: The Legacy, which was filmed in Vancouver, in the late 1990s. He used the money and resources he gained while working on Poltergeist: The Legacy to fund and staff his own film We All Fall Down, based on the events of his own life after his mother's death.

Cummins' other appearances include the TV series When Calls the Heart, Andromeda, The 4400, Dice, Friday the 13th Part VIII: Jason Takes Manhattan, Kyle XY, Smallville, Stargate SG-1, Life As We Know It, Live Once, Die Twice, UnREAL, Omen IV: The Awakening, Devour. In this movie he co-starred with Jensen Ackles from Dark Angel.

Cummins won a Genie Award for Performance by an Actor in a Supporting Role in 2000 for Love Come Down. In 2011, he began a recurring role as Thomas on the ABC series V. He portrayed Carroll McKane in Gary Sherman's horror thriller film 39: A Film by Carroll McKane. As of 2017, Cummins has been co-starring on the series When Calls the Heart and Riverdale, the latter as Sheriff Keller.

Filmography
 Friday the 13th Part VIII: Jason Takes Manhattan (1989) as Wayne Webber
 Omen IV: The Awakening as Drifter
 The Substitute (1993) as Student (uncredited)
 Cyberteens in Love (1994) as Kon
 Poltergeist: The Legacy (1996-1999) as Nick Boyle (87 episodes, 1996-1999)
 Love Come Down (2000) as Matthew Carter
 We All Fall Down (2000) as Kris
 Dark Angel (2001-2002) as Ames White (21 episodes, 2001-2002)
 Liberty Stands Still (2002) as Russell Williams
 Smallville (2002-2004) as Dr. Lawrence Garner
 Stargate SG-1 (2003) as Aden Corso (episode Forsaken)
 Ice Men (2004) as Vaughn 
 Murder at the Presidio (2005) as Sergeant Barry Atkins
 Live Once, Die Twice (2006) as Evan Lauker / Luke Ravena / Ken Valeur
 39: A Film by Carroll McKane (2006) as Carroll McKane
 Vice (2008) as Agent Arnaud
 Radio Rebel (2012) as Rob Adams
 Mr. Hockey: The Gordie Howe Story (2013) as Bill Dineen
 Down Here (2014) as Tim Brown
 The Christmas Shepard (2014) as Mark Green
 Cold Zone (2017) as Rodger Summers
 Riverdale (2017 - present) as Sheriff Keller
 Emma Fielding Mysteries (2017) as Tony Markham
 Witness to Murder: A Darrow Mystery (2019) as Brian Herriman
 When Calls the Heart (2014–present) as Henry Gowen
 Away (2020) as Jack Willmore

References

External links

1969 births
Living people
Canadian male film actors
Canadian male television actors
Best Supporting Actor Genie and Canadian Screen Award winners
People from Delta, British Columbia
Male actors from British Columbia
Film directors from British Columbia
Canadian television directors
Screenwriters from British Columbia